The 1999 Toray Pan Pacific Open was a women's tennis tournament played on indoor carpet courts at the Tokyo Metropolitan Gymnasium in Tokyo, Japan that was part of Tier I of the 1999 WTA Tour. It was the 24th edition of the tournament and was held from 2 February through 7 February 1999. Second-seeded Martina Hingis won the singles title and earned $150,000 first-prize money.

Finals

Singles

 Martina Hingis defeated  Amanda Coetzer, 6–2, 6–1
 It was Hingis' 2nd singles title of the year and the 21st of her career.

Doubles

 Lindsay Davenport /  Natasha Zvereva defeated  Martina Hingis /  Jana Novotná, 6–2, 6–3

Entrants

Seeds

Other entrants
The following players received wildcards into the singles main draw:
  Cara Black
  Miho Saeki
  Wang Shi-ting

The following players received wildcards into the doubles main draw:
  Miho Saeki /  Yuka Yoshida

The following players received entry from the singles qualifying draw:

  Els Callens
  Larisa Neiland
  Samantha Reeves
  Elena Tatarkova

The following players received entry from the doubles qualifying draw:

  Park Sung-hee /  Wang Shi-ting

References

External links
 Official website 
 Official website 
 ITF tournament edition details
 Tournament draws

Toray Pan Pacific Open
Pan Pacific Open
Toray Pan Pacific Open
Toray Pan Pacific Open
1999 Toray Pan Pacific Open
Toray Pan Pacific Open